Sonderkraftfahrzeug (abbreviated Sd.Kfz., German for "special purpose vehicle") was the ordnance inventory designation used by Nazi Germany during World War II for military vehicles; for example Sd.Kfz. 101 for the Panzer I.

Sd.Kfz. numbers were assigned to armored, tracked, and half-tracked vehicles in military service with Nazi Germany prior to and during World War II.

Sd.Kfz. numbering system
There were no strict rules regarding number series. For example, the Pz. Kpfw. II Ausf. L was designed and named as a reconnaissance vehicle, yet was placed in the 100-series rather than the 200-series. Overall, the vehicles were placed in these categories:

Sd.Kfz. 1 to 99: Unarmoured half-tracked vehicles
Sd.Kfz. 100 to 199: Tanks and tank variants, such as tank destroyers and self-propelled artillery
Sd.Kfz. 200 to 299: Reconnaissance vehicles, armoured cars, armored personnel carriers, and command tanks
Sd.Kfz. 300 and above: Mine-clearing and demolition charge laying vehicles

Designations

Sd.Kfz. 1 to 99 

 Sd.Kfz. 2 (Kettenkrad light half-track "tracked motorcycle") 
 Sd.Kfz. 2/1 (Field cable-laying variant for long distance field cable Feldfernkabel)
 Sd.Kfz. 2/2 (Field cable-laying variant for heavy field cable Schweres Feldkabel)
 Sd.Kfz. 3 - Maultier half-track cargo vehicle 
 Sd.Kfz. 3a (Maultier based on 2-ton Opel trucks)
 Sd.Kfz. 3b (Maultier based on 2-ton Ford trucks)
 Sd.Kfz. 3c (Maultier based on 2-ton Klöckner-Humboldt-Deutz trucks)
 Sd.Kfz. 4 (Maultier based on 4.5-ton trucks)
 Sd.Kfz. 4/1 (Maultier with 15 cm Nebelwerfer 42 rocket launcher)
 Sd.Kfz. 6 (5-ton medium halftrack for engineers) 
 Sd.Kfz. 6/1 (5-ton medium half-track for the artillery)
 Sd.Kfz. 6/2 (self-propelled 37 mm antiaircraft gun)
 Sd.Kfz. 6/3  "Sd.Kfz. 6 mit 7.62 cm FK 36(r)", half track carrying a captured Soviet 76mm M1936 (F-22) gun portee in an armored superstructure)
 Sd.Kfz. 7 (8-ton medium half-track)
 Sd.Kfz. 7/1 (self-propelled 20 mm quadruple anti-aircraft gun)
 Sd.Kfz. 7/2 (self-propelled 37 mm antiaircraft gun)
 Sd.Kfz. 7/6 (variant for anti-aircraft range finding)
 Sd.Kfz. 8 (12-ton heavy half-track) 
 Sd.Kfz. 9 (18-ton heavy half-track)
 Sd.Kfz. 9/1 (halftrack mounted 6 ton crane)
 Sd.Kfz. 9/2 (halftrack mounted 10 ton crane)
 Sd.Kfz. 10 (1-ton light halftrack) 
 Sd.Kfz. 10/1 (light gas detection vehicle)
 Sd.Kfz. 10/2 (light decontamination vehicle)
 Sd.Kfz. 10/3 (light decontamination sprayer vehicle)
 Sd.Kfz. 10/4 (self-propelled 20 mm FlaK 30 antiaircraft gun)
 Sd.Kfz. 10/5 (self-propelled 20 mm FlaK 38 antiaircraft gun)
 Sd.Kfz. 11 (3-ton light halftrack) 
 Sd.Kfz. 11/1 - carrier for 10 cm Nebelwerfer 35 and 10 cm Nebelwerfer 40 mortars
 Sd.Kfz. 11/1 - designation re-issued in 1944: self-propelled 20 mm FlaK 38 antiaircraft gun
 Sd.Kfz. 11/2 -medium decontamination vehicle
 Sd.Kfz. 11/3 -medium decontamination spraying vehicle
 Sd.Kfz. 11/4 -smoke-generation vehicle
 Sd.Kfz. 11/5 -medium gas detection vehicle

Sd.Kfz. 100 to 199 
 Sd.Kfz. 101 Panzer I Ausf. A and B light tank
 Sd.Kfz. 111 Panzer I ammunition carrier variant
 Sd.Kfz. 121 Panzer II Ausf. A to F light tank
 Sd.Kfz. 122 Panzer II (Flamm) flamethrower tank
 Sd.Kfz. 123 Panzer II Ausf. L "Luchs" reconnaissance tank
 Sd.Kfz. 124 Wespe self-propelled 10.5 cm leFH 18 howitzer on Panzer II chassis
 Sd.Kfz. 131 Marder II self-propelled 7.5 cm Pak 40 anti-tank gun  on Panzer II chassis
 Sd.Kfz. 132 Marder II self-propelled Soviet 76.2 mm antitank gun 
 Sd.Kfz. 135 - Marder I Panzerjäger tank destroyer on captured French Lorraine 37L tracked carrier
 Sd.Kfz. 135/1 (self-propelled 150 mm howitzer)
 Sd.Kfz. 138 (Marder III self-propelled 75 mm anti-tank gun)
 Sd.Kfz. 138/1 - Grille self-propelled 150 mm sIG 33 infantry gun on Panzer 38(t) chassis
 Sd.Kfz. 138/2 - "Hetzer" jagdpanzer based on the Panzer 38(t) chassis
 Sd.Kfz. 139 - Marder III self-propelled 76.2 mm anti-tank gun
 Sd.Kfz. 140 - Flakpanzer 38(t) (Flakpanzer 38(t) auf Selbstfahrlafette 38(t) Ausf M) self-propelled 20 mm anti-aircraft gun on a Panzer 38(t) chassis
 Sd.Kfz. 140/1 - armored reconnaissance vehicle based on the Panzer 38(t)
 Sd.Kfz. 141 - Panzer III medium tank with 37 mm or 50 mm L/42 main gun
 Sd.Kfz. 141/1 - Panzer III medium tank with 50 mm L/60 main gun)
 Sd.Kfz. 141/2 - Panzer III medium tank with short-barrelled 75 mm KwK 37 main gun
 Sd.Kfz. 142 - StuG III assault gun with 75 mm L/24 main gun
 Sd.Kfz. 142/1 - StuG III assault gun with 75 mm L/43 or L/48 main gun
 Sd.Kfz. 142/2 - StuH 42 assault gun with 105 mm L/28 main gun
 Sd.Kfz. 143 - Panzer III based artillery observation post
 Sd.Kfz. 161 - Panzer IV medium tank with 75 mm L/24 main gun 
 Sd.Kfz. 161/1 - Panzer IV medium tank with 75 mm L/43 main gun
 Sd.Kfz. 161/2 - Panzer IV medium tank with 75 mm L/48 main gun
 Sd.Kfz. 161/3 - Möbelwagen self-propelled 37 mm antiaircraft gun
 Sd.Kfz. 161/4 -Wirbelwind self-propelled 20 mm x 4 antiaircraft gun
 Sd.Kfz. 162 - Jagdpanzer IV tank destroyer with 75 mm L/48 main gun on Panzer IV chassis 
 Sd.Kfz. 162/1 - Jagdpanzer IV with 75 mm L/70 main gun)
 Sd.Kfz. 164 - Nashorn (until 1944 known as Hornisse) panzerjäger tank destroyer with 88 mm Pak 43 main gun)
 Sd.Kfz. 165 - Hummel self-propelled 150 mm artillery
 Sd.Kfz. 165/1 - Heuschrecke self-propelled 105 mm artillery
 Sd.Kfz. 166 - Brummbär self-propelled 150 mm infantry gun
 Sd.Kfz. 167 - StuG IV assault gun with 75 mm L/48 main gun
 Sd.Kfz. 171 - Panther tank 
 Sd.Kfz. 172 -proposed assault gun variant of Panther tank
 Sd.Kfz. 173 - Jagdpanther (Panzerjäger Panther) tank destroyer
 Sd.Kfz. 179 - Bergepanther recovery variant
 Sd.Kfz. 181 - Tiger I heavy tank
 Sd.Kfz. 182 - Tiger II ("Panzerkampfwagen Tiger Ausf. B") heavy tank
 Sd.Kfz. 184 - Ferdinand/Elefant "Panzerjäger Tiger (P)" tank destroyer
 Sd.Kfz. 185 - Jagdtiger tank destroyer with 88 mm L/71 main gun due to lack of supply of 128mm gun
 Sd.Kfz. 186 - Jagdtiger tank destroyer with 12.8 cm Pak 44 main gun

Sd.Kfz. 200 to 299 
 Sd.Kfz. 221 (Leichter Panzerspähwagen with 7.92 mm machinegun)
 Sd.Kfz. 222 (Leichter Panzerspähwagen with 2 cm KwK 30 gun)
 Sd.Kfz. 223 (Leichter Panzerspähwagen with radio gear)
 Sd.Kfz. 231 6-rad (Schwerer Panzerspähwagen (6 wheel) with 2 cm KwK 30 gun) 
 Sd.Kfz. 231 8-rad (Schwerer Panzerspähwagen (8 wheel) with 2 cm KwK 30 gun)
 Sd.Kfz. 232 6-rad (Schwerer Panzerspähwagen (6 wheel) with medium range and short range radios)
 Sd.Kfz. 232 8-rad (Schwerer Panzerspähwagen (8 wheel) with radio gear)
 Sd.Kfz. 233 (Schwerer Panzerspähwagen with 7.5 cm KwK 37  gun)
 Sd.Kfz. 234 (Schwerer Panzerspähwagen)
 Sd.Kfz. 234/1 (Schwerer Panzerspähwagen with 20 mm gun)
 Sd.Kfz. 234/2 (Schwerer Panzerspähwagen with 50 mm  gun)
 Sd.Kfz. 234/3 (Schwerer Panzerspähwagen with 75 mm  gun)
 Sd.Kfz. 234/4 (Schwerer Panzerspähwagen with 7.5 cm Pak 40 gun)
 Sd.Kfz. 247 (armored staff car)
 Sd.Kfz. 250 (armored light halftrack)
 Sd.Kfz. 250/1 (with communications gear) 
 Sd.Kfz. 250/2  leichter Fernsprechpanzerwagen light armored halftrack with cable-laying gear
 Sd.Kfz. 250/3 (with radio gear)
 Sd.Kfz. 250/4 ( with twin antiaircraft machineguns)
 Sd.Kfz. 250/5 leichter Beobachtungspanzerwagen  observation post)
 Sd.Kfz. 250/6 (reconnaissance vehicle)
 Sd.Kfz. 250/7 leichter Schützenpanzerwagen (schwerer Granatwerfer) (mortar carrier)
 Sd.Kfz. 250/8 leichter Schützenpanzerwagen (7.5 cm) with 7.5cm KwK 37 gun
 Sd.Kfz. 250/9 ( with 20 mm L/55 gun)
 Sd.Kfz. 250/10 (with 37 mm antitank gun)
 Sd.Kfz. 250/11 (with 2.8 cm sPzB 41 anti-tank "rifle")
 Sd.Kfz. 250/12 (for survey crews)
 Sd.Kfz. 251 (medium armored halftrack) 
 Sd.Kfz. 251/1 (with communications gear)
 Sd.Kfz. 251/2 (mortar carrier)
 Sd.Kfz. 251/3 (with radio gear)
 Sd.Kfz. 251/4 Schützenpanzerwagen für Munition und Zubehör des leIG18 - artillery tractor
 Sd.Kfz. 251/5 (medium armored halftrack for engineers)
 Sd.Kfz. 251/6 (medium armored halftrack command post)
 Sd.Kfz. 251/7 (medium armored halftrack for engineers)
 Sd.Kfz. 251/8 (medium armored halftrack ambulance)
 Sd.Kfz. 251/9 (medium armored halftrack with 75 mm L/24 gun)
 Sd.Kfz. 251/10 (medium armored halftrack with 37 mm antitank gun)
 Sd.Kfz. 251/11 (medium armored halftrack with telephone equipment)
 Sd.Kfz. 251/12 (medium armored halftrack with survey gear)
 Sd.Kfz. 251/13 (medium armored halftrack with artillery sound recording gear)
 Sd.Kfz. 251/14 (medium armored halftrack with artillery sound ranging gear)
 Sd.Kfz. 251/15 (medium armored halftrack with artillery flash spotting gear)
 Sd.Kfz. 251/16 (medium armored halftrack with flamethrower)
 Sd.Kfz. 251/17 (medium armored halftrack with 20 mm L/55 gun)
 Sd.Kfz. 251/18 (medium armored halftrack observation post)
 Sd.Kfz. 251/19 (medium armored halftrack with telephone exchange gear)
 Sd.Kfz. 251/20 (medium armored halftrack with infrared searchlight)
 Sd.Kfz. 251/21 Schützenpanzerwagen (Drilling MG151s). with triple 15mm or 20mm MG151 autocannon)
 Sd.Kfz. 251/22 (with 75 mm L/46 Pak-40 gun)
 Sd.Kfz. 251/23 (reconnaissance vehicle - possibly never produced. Was to have a 20mm gun in turret similar to Sd.Kfz. 234/1)
 Sd.Kfz. 252 (light halftrack ammunition carrier)
 Sd.Kfz. 253 leichter Gepanzerter Beobachtungskraftwagen (artillery observation post)
 Sd.Kfz. 254 (medium track or wheel observation post)
 Sd.Kfz. 260 (light armored radio car)
 Sd.Kfz. 261 Kleiner Panzerfunkwagen equipped with radios for army communication) 
 Sd.Kfz. 263 6-rad (heavy armored radio car - 6 wheel)
 Sd.Kfz. 263 8-rad (heavy armored radio car - 8 wheel)
 Sd.Kfz. 265 (Panzerbefehlswagen Panzer I command tank)
 Sd.Kfz. 266 (Panzer III command tanks with FuG 6 and FuG 2 radios)
 Sd.Kfz. 267 (Panzer III, Panther tank, and Tiger I command tanks with FuG 6 and FuG 8 radios)
 Sd.Kfz. 268 (Panzer III, Panther, and Tiger I command tanks with FuG 6 and FuG 7 radios)

Sd.Kfz. 300 and above 

 Sd.Kfz. 300 - Minenräumwagen remote-controlled mine destroyer
 Sd.Kfz. 301 - Borgward B IV heavy remote-control demolition layer
 Sd.Kfz. 302 - Goliath tracked mine (Leichter Ladungsträger Goliath) light remote-control demolition vehicle with electric motor
 Sd.Kfz. 303 - Goliath tracked mine light remote-control demolition vehicle with petrol engine 
 Sd.Kfz. 304 - Springer medium remote-control demolition vehicle
 Sd.Kfz. 305  - Opel Blitz 3-ton 4x2 Truck

See also 
 List of World War II military vehicles of Germany
 List of FV series military vehicles

References

External links

Military vehicles of Germany
Armoured fighting vehicles of Germany
Germany